Erdélyi Napló (“Transylvanian Journal”) is a Hungarian language right-wing weekly published in Cluj-Napoca, and distributed regionally throughout Transylvania.

References

External links
Official website

Hungarian-language newspapers published in Romania
Publications with year of establishment missing
Weekly newspapers published in Romania